Gary "Gedde" Watanabe (born June 26, 1955) is an American actor. He is known for voicing the character of Ling in the animated film Mulan (1998) and its sequel Mulan II (2004), as well as playing Long Duk Dong in the film Sixteen Candles (1984) and Takahara "Kaz" Kazihiro in Gung Ho (1986), and Nurse Yoshi Takata in the NBC medical drama ER from 1997 to 2003. He was also an original cast member of the Stephen Sondheim musical Pacific Overtures.

Early life and education 
Watanabe was born and raised in Ogden, Utah in a Japanese-American family. His mother, who had been previously interned during World War II, worked as a seamster at the Utah Tailoring Company. He performed in several dramatic productions in high school, both acting and singing. After graduation, Watanabe relocated to San Francisco, where he worked as a street musician while honing his acting skills.

Career
In 1976, Watanabe's first role was as a member of the original Broadway cast of Pacific Overtures, originating the roles of Priest, Girl, and The Boy. He has since appeared in a number of films and television series, the first of which was The Long Island Four in 1980.

Many of his roles are caricatured East Asians with heavy accents, though he himself does not speak Japanese.

He had a starring role in both the film Gung Ho and its television spinoff. In the 1989 movie UHF starring "Weird Al" Yankovic, Watanabe co-starred as Kuni, a karate instructor and abusive host of a TV game show called Wheel of Fish. He later reprised this role on the Weird Al Show. Watanabe appeared on Sesame Street from 1988 to 1991 as Hiroshi and had a recurring role as gay nurse Yoshi Takata on the television drama  from 1997 to 2003. During the nineties, Watanabe studied acting at Theater Theater in Hollywood, California, with Chris Aable, who introduced him to fellow actors Jon Cedar and Steve Burton. He voiced various Japanese characters on the animated television comedy The Simpsons. In 1998, he voiced Ling in the Disney animated film Mulan and reprised this role for the 2004 direct-to-video sequel Mulan II and the 2005 video game Kingdom Hearts II.

Filmography

Film

Television

Video games

Stage

See also

References

External links
 
 
 

1955 births
20th-century American male actors
21st-century American male actors
Living people
American male film actors
American male musical theatre actors
American male television actors
American male video game actors
American male voice actors
American film actors of Asian descent
American comedians of Asian descent
Male actors from Utah
American male actors of Japanese descent
People from Ogden, Utah
American Conservatory Theater alumni